Bazhou may refer to:

Bazhou, Hebei, subdivision of Langfang, China named after the historical prefecture
Bazhou District in Bazhong, Sichuan, China named after the historical prefecture

Towns
Bazhou Town, Hebei (zh), subdivision of Bazhou, Hebei, China
Bazhou Town, Sichuan (zh), subdivision of Bazhou District, China
Bazhou, Qinghai (zh), a town in Minhe Hui and Tu Autonomous County, Qinghai, China

Prefectures
Ba Prefecture (Sichuan), a prefecture between the 6th and 20th centuries in modern Sichuan, China 
Ba Prefecture (Hebei), a prefecture between the 10th and 20th centuries in modern Hebei, China
Bayingolin Mongol Autonomous Prefecture, Xinjiang, China sometimes abbreviated as Bazhou in Chinese

See also
Ba (disambiguation)